João Miguel da Cunha Teixeira (born 19 August 1981), known as Moreno, is a Portuguese retired footballer who played mainly as a defensive midfielder, currently manager of Vitória de Guimarães.

He spent most of his professional career with Vitória de Guimarães, and also had a one-and-a-half-year spell in England with Leicester City. Over 12 seasons, he amassed Primeira Liga totals of 185 matches and six goals.

Club career

Early years and Vitória
Born in the village of Urgeses, Guimarães, Moreno began playing professionally with F.C. Felgueiras – second division, not collecting one single league appearance – then moved to the lower leagues with C.A. Macedo de Cavaleiros and Clube Caçadores das Taipas. In the 2004–05 season, he joined Vitória S.C. of the Primeira Liga.

Moreno contributed 14 matches as Vitória moved straight from the second tier into a third place in 2007–08 (although mainly as a substitute). He spent most of the following campaign as a central defender, due to the serious knee condition of teammate Henrique Sereno.

Moreno appeared in 23 games in 2009–10 as the Minho side finished in sixth position, narrowly missing on qualification to the UEFA Europa League.

Leicester City
On 6 August 2010, Moreno signed a two-year contract with Football League Championship club Leicester City, joining compatriots Miguel Vítor and Paulo Sousa (manager). Four days later he made his debut for his new team, in a 4–3 win over Macclesfield Town in the first round of the League Cup.

In August 2011, after only six competitive appearances in 2010–11, Moreno was told he was free to look for a new club, and was not given a squad number for the upcoming season. His contract was cancelled on 13 January 2012.

Nacional
Moreno returned to his country in the 2012 winter transfer window, joining C.D. Nacional in Madeira until 30 June 2014. He scored twice from 12 games in his first season, and agreed to cut ties with the club one year before his link expired.

Return to Guimarães
On 4 July 2013, Moreno returned to Vitória Guimarães on a two-year deal. On 7 June 2017, already a fringe player but considered an "unvaluable locker room presence" by coach Pedro Martins, the 35-year-old captain renewed his contract for one season.

Moreno remained connected to his main club after retiring, first as an assistant then as manager of the reserve team, reaching the latter in April 2021 after Bino was appointed at the main squad. The following month, after Bino's dismissal, he replaced him for the final two matches of the campaign, losing 3–1 at home against S.L. Benfica in the last round and missing out on qualification to the UEFA Europa Conference League after being overtaken by C.D. Santa Clara.

Having spent the 2021–22 season back in charge of the second team in Liga 3, Moreno returned to the main job at the Estádio D. Afonso Henriques on 12 July when Pepa was dismissed days before the new campaign was due to begin.

Career statistics

Club

Managerial statistics

References

External links

1981 births
Living people
Sportspeople from Guimarães
Portuguese footballers
Association football midfielders
Association football utility players
Primeira Liga players
Liga Portugal 2 players
Segunda Divisão players
F.C. Felgueiras players
Clube Caçadores das Taipas players
Vitória S.C. players
C.D. Nacional players
Vitória S.C. B players
English Football League players
Leicester City F.C. players
Portugal B international footballers
Portuguese expatriate footballers
Expatriate footballers in England
Portuguese expatriate sportspeople in England
Portuguese football managers
Primeira Liga managers
Vitória S.C. managers